Big Bang (also known as 1st Japanese Album) is the second Japanese studio album by South Korean boy band Big Bang, and was released on August 19, 2009.

Production 
Production of the album started from the release of the group's first Japanese single, "My Heaven", in June 2009. The song enjoyed mild success; afterwards, the group's second single was released, "ガラガラ GO!!" (Gara Gara Go!!), and approximately a month later, the single had sold over 30,000 copies. BigBang finished recording the album by the end of July. The song "Love Club" is the only track sung entirely in English.

Commercial performance 
Big Bang debuted on the daily Oricon charts at number 2 with over 12,000 copies being sold on the first day. The album went on to chart at number 3 on the weekly Oricon charts.

Track listing

Certifications

Release history

References

External links 
Big Bang Official Site
Big Bang Japan Official Site
Big Bang by Universal Music Japan 

BigBang (South Korean band) albums
2009 albums
Universal Music Japan albums
Japanese-language albums
Albums produced by G-Dragon